Wencheng or Wen Cheng or variation, may refer to:

People
Emperor Wencheng of Northern Wei (440-465)
Princess Wencheng, Chinese princess who married King Songtsen Gampo of Tibet

Places
Wencheng County (文成县), a county in Wenzhou, Zhejiang, China
Wencheng dialect
Wencheng, Hainan (文城镇), a town in Wenchang, Hainan, China
Wencheng, Jiangxi (文成镇), a town in Yushan County, Jiangxi, China
Wencheng, Sichuan (文成镇), a town in Langzhong, Sichuan, China
Wencheng Township, Hebei (温城乡), in Jing County, Hebei, China
Wencheng Township, Henan (文城乡), in Suiping County, Henan, China
Wencheng Township, Shanxi (文城乡), in Ji County, Shanxi, China

See also

Wenchang (disambiguation)
Cheng (disambiguation)
Wen (disambiguation)